Obazu in Imo State is one of the autonomous communities in Mbieri ancient kingdom of Imo state. It is made up of six villages, namely: Umueze, Umuchoke, Umuchimanwiri, Amaogwugwu, Obilubi and Umunkwo in order of seniority. It is located at the eastern part of Mbieri and share boundaries with Umuoba, Orji and Owuala of Uratta people (Owerri North), Amatta and Akabo (Ikeduru) and Ụmụneke, Umunjam, Amaulu, Eziome, Achi, Umuagwu, Ubakuru and Amankuta (all of Mbieri town). The people are mostly Anglican though there are other Christian denomination followers among her people.

Notes

Place name, location and co-ordinates verified using GEOnet Names Server, National Geospatial-Intelligence Agency.

Towns in Imo State